Double deficit can refer to:

 Double deficit (economics)
 Double deficit theory of dyslexia